Sean Emmett (born 4 February 1970) is an English former professional Grand Prix motorcycle road racer.

Racing career
Born in Walton on Thames, Sean Emmett began his career in 1989 at Brands Hatch. In 1989, he won the 350cc Production Championship. He also won the Avon Tyres Trophy for "the most talented young rider with the most promising future". Previous winners included John Surtees, Mike Hailwood and Barry Sheene. He competed in his first Grand Prix in 1993 riding for the Shell-Harris Yamaha team, finishing the season in 19th place in the F.I.M. 500cc class. In 1994, Emmett finished in 15th place as a member of the Suzuki factory racing team, followed by two 22nd-place finishes in 1995 and 1996.

In 1999, Sean Emmett competed in the Superbike World Championship, finishing in 28th place aboard a Ducati. Also in 1999, he won the closest ever British Superbike Championship race, defeating Troy Bayliss by just 0.001sec. In the 2001 Superbike World Championship, he finished in 32nd place after competing as a wildcard in a single event.

Sean Emmett competed in the British Superbike Championship between 1997 and 2008. During which he was on the podium 65 times with 19 race wins. Sean Emmett most successful years were in 2001 and 2002 when he finished the year in third place.

In 2008 Sean participated in the Yamaha R1 Cup, a support series to the British Superbike Championship. Sean started the campaign well however, the series was dominated by Jon Kirkham the eventual series winner.

In 2011 Emmett won on a RGV 500 (formerly ridden by Kenny Roberts, Jr. in 1999) at the Bikers Classic Meeting at Spa Francorchamps Circuit in Belgium. In February 2013 Emmett won in the South African Classic TT racing series "Day of the Champion" at Zwartkops Circuit.

Grand Prix career statistics

Points system from 1993

(key) (Races in bold indicate pole position; races in italics indicate fastest lap)

Personal life
On 19 February 2013, Emmett's 27-year-old new wife Abigail Elson died in a fall from the open window of their hotel room in Dubai.

They were spending a two-day stopover on the return trip back to UK from their honeymoon in Cape Town, South Africa. Emmett's passport was confiscated and he was detained for ten months in Dubai during the subsequent investigation. Emmett told the BBC that he suspected local media in Dubai intended to implicate him as a murder suspect.

Emmett was allowed to return from Dubai after ten months, but on landing at Heathrow Airport on 5 December 2013 was arrested on suspicion of murder by Surrey police, who conducted their own investigation of the circumstances. Emmett was bailed several times during the investigation. In February 2016, a statement by Surrey police confirmed Emmett's bail had been cancelled and no further action would be taken. The inquest into Abigail's death is still ongoing as of October 2020. Emmett testified during the inquest, but declined to answer questions about allegations of domestic violence in his relationship with Ms Elson, repeatedly stating "I decline to answer that".

In October 2014 a Domestic Violence Protection Order was imposed on Emmett after an altercation with his girlfriend at a pub. He was subsequently jailed for 28 days for violating this order.
In March 2015 Emmett was jailed for three months for assaulting his girlfriend.

References

1970 births
Living people
People from Walton-on-Thames
English motorcycle racers
500cc World Championship riders
Superbike World Championship riders
British Superbike Championship riders